No Policy is the debut studio EP by the American hardcore punk band State of Alert, the first band to be fronted by Henry Rollins. Consisting of eight tracks, it was recorded at Inner Ear Studios in Arlington, Virginia, produced by Skip Groff and engineered by Inner Ear owner Don Zientara. No Policy was released on Dischord Records in March 1981, as the label's second release. No Policy was financed by Rollins, as Dischord was tied up in releasing Minor Threat's debut EP.

Track listing

Personnel 
 Henry Garfield – vocals
 Michael Hampton – guitar
 Wendel Blow – bass
 Simon Jacobsen – drums

Production
 Skip Groff – producer
 Don Zientara – engineer
 Tina Angelos – cover art
 Michael Hampton & Chris Edwards – sleeve

References

Bibliography 
 

 

State of Alert albums
1981 debut EPs
Dischord Records EPs